Bishopsgate was a gate in the City wall of London.

It gives its name to:
United Kingdom
Bishopsgate, a street and ward in the City of London
Bishopsgate railway station, a former railway station
Bishopsgate (Low Level) railway station, a former railway station
Canada
Bishopsgate, a suburb of the County of Brant, in Ontario
Singapore
Bishopsgate, a road in Tanglin linking Nathan Road to Jervois Road

Other uses
Buildings on the street
22 Bishopsgate
99 Bishopsgate
100 Bishopsgate
Bishopsgate Library
Bishopsgate Institute, a cultural institute
Broadgate Tower
St Helen's Bishopsgate, church
St Ethelburga's Bishopsgate, church
St Botolph-without-Bishopsgate, church
Other
Bishopsgate School, in Surrey
Events
1993 Bishopsgate bombing
Bishopsgate mutiny